Neunkirchen is the capital of the district of Neunkirchen in the Austrian state of Lower Austria. As of 2020 it has a population of 12,721.

Geography 
Neunkirchen is situated in the Steinfeld region of the Vienna Basin, part of Industrieviertel in the southwestern area of Lower Austria. Schwarza river is flowing through it.

Geographic breakdown 
The municipality consists of three localities, which are also cadastral communities of the same names (area as of 1 January 2001, population as of 1 January 2022):

 Mollram (8.23 km²; pop. 702)
 Neunkirchen (5.96 km²; pop. 11.152) Quarters: Innere Stadt, Tal, Steinplatte, Mühlfeld, Au, Steinfeld, Lerchenfeld, Blätterstraßensiedlung
 Peisching (6.12 km²; pop. 691)

Neighbouring municipalities 
NE: Sankt Egyden am Steinfeld; E: Breitenau; SE: Natschbach-Loipersbach; S: Wartmannstetten; W: Ternitz; NW: Würflach

History 
Neunkirchen is one of the oldest settlements in the Vienna Basin. It has been permanently settled since the La Tène culture. There was a Roman settlement from about 30 to 400 AD near the inner city, but its name is unknown. Neunkirchen was first mentioned in 1094 as "Niuwenchirgun". The town was given city status in 1920.

Population

Personalities 
Anton Burger, Austrian-German commandant of Theresienstadt concentration camp, Nazi SS war criminal, born in Neunkirchen.
Christian Fuchs, Austrian footballer, born in Neunkirchen.
Hubert Mara, Austrian computer scientist, born in Neunkirchen.
Julius Steinfeld, Agudat Yisrael politician, coorganizer of the Kindertransport.
Alfons Maria Stickler, Austrian prelate, born in Neunkirchen.

References

Cities and towns in Neunkirchen District, Austria